Test Drive is a racing video game developed by Distinctive Software and published by Accolade, released in 1987 for the Amiga, Atari ST, Commodore 64, and DOS, in 1988 for the Apple II, and later ported for the PC-98 in 1989. It is the first game in the Test Drive series.

Gameplay

The player chooses one of five supercars (Lamborghini Countach, Lotus Esprit Turbo, Chevrolet Corvette C4, Porsche 911 Turbo (930), or Ferrari Testarossa) to drive on a winding cliffside two-lane road while avoiding traffic and outrunning police speed traps. The course's five stages are separated by gas station pit stops.

Release
In 1987, Accolade published Test Drive as a computer game worldwide, and Electronic Arts imported it to the United Kingdom. The quality of the Amiga, Atari ST, Commodore 64, and DOS ports differ from each other. The Amiga version's detailed visuals and audio realistically depicted the game's racing theme, while its Atari ST counterpart used simplified graphics and sound effects. The Commodore 64 and DOS ports were of similar quality to the Amiga version. The gameplay was kept intact for all platforms.

Reception and legacy
Test Drive was a commercial hit. In late 1989, Video Games & Computer Entertainment reported that the game's sales had surpassed 400,000 units and were well on their way to the half-million mark.

It received generally positive reviews from video game critics. Computer Gaming World stated in 1987 that Test Drive "offers outstanding graphics and the potential to 'hook' every Pole Position fan". Compute! praised the excellent graphics and sound, but noted that the game only had one course. The game was reviewed in 1988 in Dragon #132 by Hartley, Patricia, and Kirk Lesser in "The Role of Computers" column. The reviewers gave the game 4 out of 5 stars. David M. Wilson reviewed the game for Computer Gaming World, and stated that "there may be more competitive racing games on the market, but this game combines the enjoyment of driving five of the most exotic sportscars in the world with outrunning "Smokies" on mountain highways. What more could a race car junkie (or arcade fan) ask for?!"

Test Drive spawned several sequels and spin-offs. Distinctive Software developed its 1989 sequel, The Duel: Test Drive II.

Reviews
Isaac Asimov's Science Fiction Magazine v12 n7 (1988 07)

References

External links

1987 video games
Accolade (company) games
Amiga games
Apple II games
Atari ST games
Commodore 64 games
DOS games
NEC PC-9801 games
1
Video games developed in Canada
Distinctive Software games
Single-player video games
Electronic Arts games
Pony Canyon games